Metalocalypse is an American adult animated television series, created by Brendon Small and Tommy Blacha, which premiered on August 6, 2006, followed by a musical one-hour special, Metalocalypse: The Doomstar Requiem, on October 27, 2013 on Adult Swim. The television program centers on the larger-than-life melodic death metal band Dethklok, and often portrays dark and macabre content, including such subjects as violence, death, and the drawbacks of fame, with hyperbolic black comedy. The show was widely heralded as both a parody and a pastiche of heavy metal culture.

The music, written by guitarist/creator Brendon Small, was credited to the band and featured in most episodes. The animation was often carefully synced to the music with the chord positions and fingering of the guitar parts shown in some detail. The show was cancelled in 2013. In 2021, Adult Swim announced a direct-to-video film has been greenlit.

Overview
In the series, Dethklok is a death metal band that enjoys a popularity level unheard of in reality, ranking as the seventh-largest economy on Earth by the end of the second season. Series creator Small described them as "like the Beatles, just a thousand times more dangerous and a billion times more stupid".

The fictional band members are Nathan Explosion, Skwisgaar Skwigelf, Pickles, William Murderface and Toki Wartooth. Their manager is Charles Foster Offdensen.

If Dethklok endorses a product or service, competitors are quickly driven out of business. Organizations worldwide, ranging from governments to businesses, go out of their way to avoid hindering Dethklok, to the point that the band is allowed to maintain its own police force and can get away with any crime imaginable with virtually no repercussions, although the band is often too oblivious to even notice that they are committing illegal acts.

The members of Dethklok tend to cause disaster wherever they travel, and anything remotely associated with them likewise attracts chaos. Dethklok concerts are so notoriously dangerous that those attending are required to sign "pain waivers" at the entrance, releasing the band from legal liability in the very likely case attendees are killed or maimed. The band is shown to have a callous disregard for the safety of their fans, as shown in the first episode where they pour scalding hot coffee over concertgoers.

The band's popularity is such that impressionable fans will do anything for them, even if that means death, which is usually the case. In the episode "Dethgov", fans of Dethklok lynch the governor of Florida after he refuses to establish a holiday for lead singer Nathan Explosion (to be named "Nathan Explosion Day"), whom they then proceed to elect as governor in a landslide write-in victory (despite the fact Nathan had no interest in the job and let the rest of Dethklok run the state into the ground).

The band's unnatural popularity and trail of destruction has attracted the attention of an Illuminati-style group, known as The Tribunal, dedicated to monitoring Dethklok's activity and plans. Typically, episodes involve the Tribunal attempting to maintain and perpetuate public ignorance and rampant consumerism whenever Dethklok's antics inadvertently threaten to upset the status quo. The Tribunal, led by a mysterious character named "Mr. Salacia", works off the premise that Dethklok's unusual powers are the result of an ancient Sumerian prophecy about an "Apocalypse of Metal". General Crozier, the military leader in the group, appears to desire either the death of the band's members or the dismantlement of the band itself, but Mr. Salacia consistently overrules him to prevent this from happening. Most episodes show the Tribunal attempting to covertly thwart the band by calling in various "specialists", such as "military pharmaceutical psychotropic drug manufacturers", "celebrity depression experts", or various legally compromised characters who attempt to infiltrate the group.

Development
Brendon Small's show Home Movies ended its run in 2004, which freed Small to spend time with writer friend Tommy Blacha. They went to metal shows around the same time they were both trying to pitch shows to different networks. This was how they came up with the idea of doing a show about a metal band that was vastly more popular than The Beatles had been. They came up with the storyline, wrote a theme song, and had a friend Jon Schnepp design the characters. The series was originally called Deathclock, but the name could not be used due to an existing trademark. The show and the main characters' band were then renamed Dethklok. The show's title was then extended to Dethklok Metalocalypse, although the starring band still retained the name Dethklok. The title was finally shortened to Metalocalypse because the extended show title was too complicated. They pitched the show to Adult Swim, which greenlit it in 2005 with a 20-episode contract.

In developing the series, Small looked at the budget for what he considered to be the cheapest show to produce at the time on Adult Swim, Tom Goes to the Mayor. On asking Tim and Eric, who produced the show, Small discovered that their budget was $110,000 per episode. Small then went to Titmouse and asked if they could do Metalocalypse for under $110,000 per episode while still maintaining Small's vision. Titmouse responded they could do it for $109,099 per episode averaged over the entire season.

Broadcast history
The show's first season consists of 20 11-minute episodes, the first of which premiered on the Adult Swim Video on August 4, 2006, and on Adult Swim proper the following Sunday. Metalocalypse was renewed for a second season consisting of 19 episodes which began airing on September 23, 2007, two days before the CD release of The Dethalbum. The second season also introduced an updated version of the show's opening theme (officially titled "Deththeme"), which had been rerecorded for The Dethalbum. The Metalocalypse premiere was the #1 rated show in its time slot among males aged 18–34 and earned the network's best premiere delivery and ratings in 2006. Among the top ad-supported basic cable programs of the week, Metalocalypse ranked #12 among men 18–34 and #6 among men 18–24. The series premiere ranked #30 for the week among adults 18–34.

At San Diego Comic Con 2008, Tommy Blacha confirmed that the show would be renewed for a third season which premiered on November 8, 2009. The episodes of season three are 21 minutes long (30 minutes including commercials).

The fourth season returned to the original 11 minute run-time. Season four premiered April 29, 2012, and consisted of 12 episodes.

Actor Mark Hamill stated in 2013 that the fifth season of the show was currently in production. Brendon Small later denied this, stating that it had not yet reached production.

On May 10, 2013, Brendon Small and Adult Swim announced that a Metalocalypse one-hour rock opera special, Metalocalypse: The Doomstar Requiem, was in the works. This special aired on October 27, 2013.

In April 2014, in an interview on Steve Agee: Uhhh podcast, Brendon Small stated that a fifth and final season was in pre-production and that he was waiting on a budget from Adult Swim. Small has since stated that he has begun exploring other ways of concluding the show, which may take the form of a special or a film, and that he was in the early stages of planning.

Cancellation
In March 2015, Brendon Small issued a statement saying that he had approached Adult Swim with the idea to do the finale as a "big mini-series," but was turned down by the network. It was later revealed that Metalocalypse had been canceled; however, Small tweeted that he has plans "to service a final story and music—but not in way fans are used to".

In October 2015, Small announced a month-long social campaign, called "Metalocalypse Now", to have fans of the show contact Hulu and Adult Swim to convince them to co-fund the series finale to Metalocalypse, entitled: Metalocalypse: The Army of the Doomstar – The Final Chapter. As a result of the campaign, financial backers stepped forward to fund a final season, but Adult Swim declined to pick up the series. In a May 2016 interview, Small said he is "all but finished making Dethklok records".

In May 2021 it was announced that a direct-to-video film is in production; it was later announced that the film would also be released on HBO Max.

Voice cast and characters

Main cast members

Guest stars

Musicians
 
 Michael Amott
 Asesino
 Jack Black
 Richard Christy
 Brann Dailor
 Warrel Dane
 Exodus
 George "Corpsegrinder" Fisher
 Ace Frehley
 Marty Friedman
 Billy Gibbons
 Angela Gossow
 Dave Grohl
 Kirk Hammett
 James Hetfield
 Brent Hinds
 Gene Hoglan
 Scott Ian
 ICS Vortex
 Ihsahn
 Arve Isdal
 Mike Keneally
 King Diamond
 Grutle Kjellson
 Herbrand Larsen
 Jeff Loomis
 Marco Minnemann
 Mike Patton
 Matt Pike
 Cam Pipes
 Samoth
 Troy Sanders
 Joe Satriani
 Ben Shepherd
 Silenoz
 Slash
 Steve Smyth
 Kim Thayil
 Trym Torson
 Devin Townsend
 Steve Vai
 Dweezil Zappa

Other guest stars
Besides the metal and rock musicians above, other celebrities have also contributed to this show, including:
 
 Samantha Eggar
 Chris Elliott
 Janeane Garofalo
 Jon Hamm
 Pat Healy
 Werner Herzog
 Frankie Ingrassia
 Marc Maron
 Christopher McCulloch
 Byron Minns
 Laraine Newman
 Patton Oswalt
 "Dr. Drew" Pinsky
 Brian Posehn
 Andy Richter
 Laura Silverman
 Amber Tamblyn
 James Urbaniak
 Raya Yarbrough

Episodes

International broadcast
In Canada, Metalocalypse previously aired on Teletoon's Teletoon at Night block and later G4's Adult Digital Distraction block. The series currently airs on the Canadian version of Adult Swim.

Music
The show includes music written under the name Dethklok by Brendon Small, often in the form of incidental music, and songs about the subjects of the episode in which they are featured, although three albums have since been released compiling full songs from the show. An EP titled Adult Swim Presents: ...And You Will Know Us by the Trail of Dead on Tour with Dethklok was released in 2007.

The Dethalbum

The Dethalbum was released on September 25, 2007, in both standard and deluxe editions. The album is a combination of full-length tracks from the series and completely new songs. The album debuted at #21 on the Billboard 200 chart with nearly 34,000 copies sold in its first week. The Dethalbum was also streamed 45,000 times when it went live on AOL Music during the week of its release.

Dethalbum II

Dethalbum II was released on September 29, 2009, in both standard and deluxe editions. The album includes many songs from the second season of the series and completely new songs. The deluxe version includes a DVD containing music videos for all the songs played during Dethklok's 2008 tour with Soilent Green and Chimaira.

Dethalbum III

Dethalbum III was released on October 16, 2012. The album features Brendon Small, Gene Hoglan and Bryan Beller. Ulrich Wild co-produced and mixed the album.

The Doomstar Requiem

The Doomstar Requiem was released on October 29, 2013. It is the soundtrack album to the Metalocalypse special Metalocalypse: The Doomstar Requiem. The album features Brendon Small, Bryan Beller, Gene Hoglan, a 50-piece orchestra and, for the first time on a Dethklok album, live Dethklok guitarist Mike Keneally. The series has been made available for on-demand streaming on Hulu Plus, as part of a deal made with Hulu and Turner Broadcasting.

Endorsements
Dethklok, the in-show band, also endorses several real-world music products, including Marshall Amplification, Gibson guitars, EMG pickups, David Eden Amplification, Universal Audio, M-Audio, Dunlop Manufacturing/MXR, and Line 6 gear.

Originally endorsing Krank Amplification, Brendon Small and Dethklok began an arrangement with Marshall in 2009.

According to the official Dethklok MySpace, the Gibson Guitar Corporation was also planning on making a Dethklok signature guitar. During the 2008 NAMM Convention, a special edition Epiphone Explorer was unveiled to a select few. Pictures of show creator Brendon Small holding the guitar can be seen on the internet. Small later confirmed that Gibson, not Epiphone, would be releasing a Dethklok Explorer. A Dethklok "Thunderhorse" Explorer has been released by Gibson; it would later become Skwisgaar's main guitar on the show. In May 2012, Brendon Small revealed a prototype for the new Brendon Small "Snow Falcon" Flying V, it now serves as Toki Wartooth's primary guitar on the show. The guitar was released in December 2013 by Gibson. In December 2016, an Epiphone version was released.

At NAMM 2013 Brendon Small revealed that an Epiphone version of the Dethklok "Thunderhorse" Explorer was in production. It was released in April 2013 as the Brendon Small "Thunderhorse" Explorer.

On October 25, 2014, Brendon Small premiered the prototype of the Gibson Dethklok "Snow Horse" Explorer, a silver burst Gibson Explorer modelled after one of Skwisgaar's guitars.

In 2007, Shocker Toys produced a limited run of statues of William Murderface and Nathan Explosion. In 2008 and again in 2009, Shocker Toys made a boxed set of vinyl figures with limited articulation of all 5 of the band members. Kid Robot produced unarticulated figures of Murderface and Toki as part of an Adult Swim blind boxed mini figure line. At the 2009 San Diego Comic Con, Shocker Toys released an exclusive limited edition Dr. Rockso Mallow.

The song "Thunderhorse" is featured in the game Guitar Hero II by Harmonix and RedOctane as a bonus song. In early 2010, Adult Swim released a "Dethklok Fountain" for sale on their website for $40,000. In January 2010, "Laser Canon Deth Sentence" became a downloadable song for Guitar Hero 5. "Bloodlines" is on the main setlist in Guitar Hero: Warriors of Rock.

Dethklok was featured in Soundgarden's video for "Black Rain", which Small directed. Dethklok's 2009 tour with Mastodon was sponsored by Brütal Legend and the song "Murmaider" was featured in the game. The song "The Cyborg Slayers" was featured in the soundtrack for the game Saints Row: The Third.

There are guitar tablature books for all three Dethklok albums, which were released through Alfred Publishing. A bass tab anthology containing tablature from the first two albums was also released through Alfred Publishing. The production of these books has subsequently led to the removal of all Dethklok tabs from websites such as Ultimate Guitar.

On August 17, 2012, a two-minute animated short aired on Adult Swim featuring Dethklok and Death from Darksiders II, in promotion of the game.

On September 25, 2013, an animated short featuring Dethklok, entitled "'Tallica Parking Lot" (a reference to Heavy Metal Parking Lot), premiered at Fantastic Fest.

On April 28, 2015, the Dethklok songs "Awaken", "Go into the Water" and "Thunderhorse" became available for download in the video game Rocksmith 2014 as part of the "Dethklok 3-Song Pack". Small appeared in an advert for the game in 2016 along with comedian Steve Agee playing the song "Go into the Water". Later, on April 3, 2018, the songs "Black Fire Upon Us", "Bloodlines" and "Murmaider" were added as part of the "Dethklok II" song pack.

Touring history

Dethklok does have a touring band, although there are no actual human counterparts to the characters on the show. The band consists of show co-creator, vocalist/guitarist Brendon Small, who writes and sings most of the music for the show, alongside drummer Gene Hoglan, bassist Bryan Beller, and second guitarist Mike Keneally.

Home media release

The series is also available on HBO Max since May 27, 2020.

Video games
In 2009 the UK Adult Swim site released two flash games titled Deth Toll and Deth Toll II. The games are played in a similar fashion to Guitar Hero or Rock Band except with Dethklok songs.

A video game based on the series, titled Metalocalypse: Dethgame, was revealed at the 2009 San Diego Comic-Con. The game was to be published by Konami and be available for download on both the PlayStation 3's PlayStation Network and Xbox 360's Xbox Live Marketplace. Players would have played as one of The Gears, and the game was to be set in Mordhaus, where the player would fight mutant fans. The game would have included music taken from Dethklok's albums. The game has been canceled, because "the creative direction of the game would not live up to the high standards...set for the project".

The Dethklok songs "Thunderhorse" and "Bloodlines" are featured in the video games Guitar Hero II and Guitar Hero: Warriors of Rock, respectively. Additionally, the Dethklok song "Laser Cannon Deth Sentence" was added to Warriors of Rock as downloadable content. The song "Murmaider" was included in the soundtrack to the 2009 video game Brütal Legend.

Comic book
The Dethklok vs. The Goon (one-shot) was issued by Dark Horse Comics on July 23, 2009. Written by Brendon Small and Eric Powell. Dethklok is sent into the same universe as The Goon, who seeks to kill them.

The next day, Dark Horse announced a forthcoming short-run Dethklok series in collaboration with Adult Swim, which appeared the next year.
Dethklok #1, October 6, 2010. Written by Brendon Small, Jon Schnepp and Jeremy Barlow. Dethklok decides to venture into the frozen food market with Dethklok frozen dinners, though after many setbacks, the band releases lethally poisonous food on their fans.
Dethklok #2, December 15, 2010. Written by Brendon Small, Jon Schnepp and Jeremy Barlow. Dethklok returns to Finland to apologize for their last visit when they awakened a troll, while a cult of troll worshippers plan to use the band to unleash end times through the trolls once again.
Dethklok #3, February 23, 2011. Written by Brendon Small, Jon Schnepp and Jeremy Barlow. Dethklok builds a cross-country train to help blues legend Mashed Potatoes Johnson get out of his deal with Satan over his soul, while a ghost of a train-riding murderer is about to send things off the rails.
All four comics appeared with variant cover art by Eric Powell and Jon Schnepp. The Dethklok HC deluxe hardcover collected the four comics and was released June 15, 2011.

See also

References

External links

 
 
 Official tumblr
 Official Myspace
 Official Adult Swim with Metalocalypse section, YouTube
 Metalocalypse on Adult Swim UK (Archived URL) Original link

 
2000s American adult animated television series
2000s American black comedy television series
2000s American musical comedy television series
2010s American adult animated television series
2010s American black comedy television series
2010s American musical comedy television series
2006 American television series debuts
2013 American television series endings
American adult animated comedy television series
American adult animated musical television series
Anime-influenced Western animated television series
American flash adult animated television series
English-language television shows
Adult Swim original programming
Heavy metal television series
Television series by Williams Street
Television series created by Brendon Small